Suwayri (also spelled Suweireh or Swarey) is a village in northern Syria located northwest of Homs in the Homs Governorate. Nearby towns include Shin to the northwest, al-Mahfurah to the north, Ghur Gharbiyah to the northeast, Qazhal to the east, Khirbet Tin Nur to the southeast, Khirbet al-Hamam to the south, Hadidah to the southwest and Mazinah to the west. According to the Syria Central Bureau of Statistics, Suwayri had a population of 2,966 in the 2004 census, making it the second largest locality in the Shin nahiyah ("subdistrict"). Its inhabitants are predominantly Alawites.

References

Bibliography

 

Populated places in Homs District
Alawite communities in Syria